Johnny Torres (born April 24, 1976) is a Colombian-American soccer midfielder and coach who is currently the head coach of his alma mater, Creighton University.  Torres has played in Major League Soccer, USL-1, and also played for the Omaha Vipers of the Major Indoor Soccer League.  He has also earned caps with the U.S. Futsal team.

Youth
Torres was born in Medellín, Colombia, where his father and several uncles played semi-professional soccer.  In 1981, when Torres was five years old, his family moved to Houston, Texas where Torres played for the local club team Houston Texans.  In 1986, his family decided to return to Colombia, but Torres' youth soccer coach, Carlos Clarke, a native of Chile, offered to adopt Torres.  His family agreed, and Torres was adopted by the Clarkes who lived in Dickinson, Texas.  Torres would play soccer at Dickinson High School where he was a three-time USA Today high school soccer All-American.

Player

College
After graduating from high school in 1994, Torres attended Creighton University.  The Bluejays had an excellent four-year run during Torres' time with the team.  The school racked up a 62–18–5 record and made four consecutive appearances in the NCAA post-season tournament.  He was the 1996 Soccer America Player of the Year (for his junior season). In 1996, Torres' senior year, Creighton reached the NCAA College Cup for the first time in school history.  Torres was showered with honors during his time at Creighton.  He was selected as a Second Team All Missouri Valley Conference (MVC) player as a freshman.  The next three years, he made the All-MVC first team.  He was also a first-team All-American his junior and senior years.  In 1997, he was the MCV Player of the Year, Most Valuable Player (MVP) of the MCV tournament and the Hermann Trophy winner.  He is third on Creighton's career scoring list with 46 goals and is tied for second on the career assists list with 36.  
In 1996, during his time at Creighton, Torres became a U.S. citizen.  In 2004, he was inducted into the Creighton University athletic Hall of Fame.

Professional
In January 1998, the New England Revolution of the Major League Soccer (MLS) selected Torres as its top draft pick (fifth overall).  The Revolution had high hopes for the talented midfielder.  Torres spent four years with the team, never entirely playing up to expectations.  He played 88 games, starting 55, scoring only 8 goals and assisting on 14 others.  In 2000, the Revolution sent him on loan to the Connecticut Wolves for one game.  On August 16, 2001, the Revolution traded Torres, along with Shaker Asad, to the Miami Fusion for Leo Cullen and a 2003 first round draft choice.  Torres would only play a single season for the Fusion.  Miami was one of the 2 teams contracted after the 2001 season.  After the Fusion folded in January 2002, Torres moved to the Milwaukee Wave of the Major Indoor Soccer League (MISL) for the 2001–2002 indoor season, which was already in play.  Torres' move to MISL came about from his having played for the U.S. Futsal team in 1999 when Keith Tozer, coach of the Wave, coached the futsal team.  When Tozer heard about the Fusion's collapse, he contacted Torres about moving to the MISL.

At the end of the MISL season, Torres briefly returned to the MLS, playing four games with the Chicago Fire when the team was decimated with injuries in 2002.  However, he left the Fire and moved to the Minnesota Thunder of the A-League, now known as the United Soccer League (USL) First Division.  Torres played both the 2002 and 2003 outdoor seasons with the Thunder.

While playing outdoor soccer with the Thunder, Torres also played indoor soccer with the Milwaukee Wave of the MISL.  However, in May 2004, he signed with the Wave's parent organization, also known as the Milwaukee Wave.  This organization fields two teams, the indoor Milwaukee Wave of the MISL and outdoor Milwaukee Wave United of the USL.   This would allow Torres to play both indoor and outdoor soccer with the same organization rather than bouncing between Milwaukee and Minnesota from summer to winter. To sign Torres, the Wave United traded forward Dan Antoniuk to the San Diego Sockers for a 2005 fourth round draft pick.

In 2004 Torres was named to USL All-League First Team, having scored 11 goals in 28 games with the Wave United. Torres was a member of the 2005 MISL championship Milwaukee Wave which swept the Cleveland Force in two games. He tore the MCL in his right knee during the 2005–2006 season.  In 2010, he made his return to indoor soccer, with the Omaha Vipers of the MISL.

International
In 1997, Torres was a member of the third place team at the 1997 World University Games.  Torres ended the tournament as the U.S. team's leading scorer with 5 goals.  Torres has played for the U.S. Futsal team from 1999 to 2006, earning 13 caps and scoring 9 goals.  He was the team leader with five goals at the 2004 FIFA Futsal World Championship.

Coaching
Torres returned to Creighton in 2007 as a graduate assistant under then head coach Bob Warming. Torres finished his studies at Creighton that he started during his playing career, graduating with a Bachelor's degree in Sociology in May 2008. Torres was promoted to full-time assistant in 2008, and was named interim head coach on January 26, 2011 after Jamie Clark resigned as head coach of Creighton to take the same position at the University of Washington. Eventually Creighton hired Elmar Bolowich, relieving Torres of interim head coach duties.

References

External links
 Creighton Bluejays bio

1976 births
Living people
American soccer players
American men's futsal players
Colombian emigrants to the United States
Colombian expatriate footballers
Colombian footballers
Connecticut Wolves players
Creighton Bluejays men's soccer players
Creighton Bluejays men's soccer coaches
Major League Soccer players
New England Revolution players
Miami Fusion players
Chicago Fire FC players
Major Indoor Soccer League (2001–2008) players
Milwaukee Wave players
Minnesota Thunder players
Milwaukee Wave United players
Footballers from Medellín
A-League (1995–2004) players
New England Revolution draft picks
American sportspeople of Colombian descent
People from Dickinson, Texas
All-American men's college soccer players
Association football midfielders
Hermann Trophy men's winners
American soccer coaches